The battle of Coștangalia was the battle fought on 15 July 1863, near the village of Coștangalia, Romanian United Principalities (now located in Moldova). It was by the Romanian forces, against the Polish rebels marching through territory of Romanian United Principalities, to join the rebels fighting in the January Uprising, in Poland. The battle ended with Polish victory, and the retreat of the Romanian forces. Despite the victory, the Polish insurgents capitulated to Romania two days later, on 17 July.

Background 
Following the start of the January Uprising in January 1863 in Poland by the insurgent forces against the Russian Empire, the government of the Ottoman Empire, allowed Polish expatriates to form revolutionary forces on their territory that would aid the rebellion in Poland. The unit was formed in the city of Tulcea, and included 213 armed people. It was commanded by colonel Zygmunt Miłkowski. The unit marched through Ottoman territory towards the border of the Romanian United Principalities, with the plan of crossing its territory, to reach the Bessarabia Governorate, Russian Empire, and then move to the Podolian Governorate, where they hoped to reactivate fighting in the region of modern Ukraine.

Battle 
After the Polish insurrectionaries crossed the border, Alexandru Ioan Cuza, the ruler of the Romanian United Principalities, sent forces to stop them from marching through his country. These consisted of 7 companies of infantry, counting 1260 soldiers, with additional aid of 60 cavalrymen, all commanded by the colonel Călinescu. The Polish insurrectionaries were ordered to disarm themselves, which they refused. As such, both sides begun the fight on 15 July 1863, near the village of Coștangalia (now located in Moldova).

Miłkowski ordered the infantry under the command of Józef Jagmin, to scatter actors the valley. On the right wing, the insurgents had captured local houses, and on the left, had hidden behind the trees. Soon after that, the Romanian forces begun firing at the insurgents. In the response, Polish infantry charged at the enemy. At the same time, the Romanian cavalry charged at Polish forces, however, they were destroyed before their reached their target. One of the Romanian companies attempt to flank the enemy from the right wing, however they were defeated by soldiers with bayonets, while the central line of the Romanian forces had been breached by the insurgents. Due to the casualties and the chaos of the battlefield, most of the Romanian forces retreated. The exception was the left wing of the infantry, which charged at Polish forces. However, it was not able to reach their target, and under heavy fire, were forced to retreat as well. Polish insurgents had captured the weapons and the ammunition abandoned by retreating Romanian forces.

Aftermath 
The battle was won by the Polish insurrectionaries, who had 6 fatal casualties, and 20 soldiers injured, including 12 heavily injured. Their forces continued the march, crossing the Prut river. Two days later, on 17 July, without bigger hopes to continue the march to the Russian border, the soldiers surrendered their weapons to Romanian soldiers. They were allowed to continue their travel to Poland individually, without their weapons.

Notes

References 

Coștangalia, battle of
Coștangalia, battle of
Battle of Coștangalia
Battle of Coștangalia
Battle of Coștangalia
Coștangalia, battle of
Coștangalia, battle of